Gadhali is a village and former non-salute princely state on Saurashtra peninsula in Gujarat, western India.

Village
The modern village is in Gadhda Taluka, in Gadhada Vidhan Sabha constituency, in Botad district.

History
The minor princely state, in Gohilwad prant, was ruled by Gohil Rajput Chieftains.

In 1901 it comprised three villages, with a population of 1,537, yielding 10,000 Rupees state revenue (1903-4, mostly from land), paying 2000 Rupees tribute, to the Gaikwar Baroda State and Junagadh State.

References

Sources and external links 
 Imperial Gazetteer, on DSAL.UChicago.edu - Kathiawar

Princely states of Gujarat
Rajput princely states